The Orliński RO-7 Orlik (Eaglet) was a prize-winning Polish home-built aircraft, first flown in 1987. It was restored to flight, with improvements, in 2003.

Design and development

Roman Orliński began to design the Orlik in the spring of 1984. Its first flight was made on 22 February 1987.

It has a two part, low, rectangular plan, wooden wing set with 5° of dihedral and built around a single main spar. Plywood skin ahead of the spar around the leading edge forms a torsion-resistant D-box; behind the spar the wing is fabric covered. Its ailerons, mounted on an auxiliary spar, fill a little under half the span.

The forward fuselage has a welded steel-tube structure but the rear is a wooden monocoque; throughout, the section is essentially rectangular with rounded decking. Behind the metal-covered, conventionally mounted engine, a Walter Mikron III salvaged from an earlier project, the forward fuselage is ply covered. The cockpit is over the wing, normally enclosed by a two-part canopy though it can be flown open with only its windscreen in place.

The Orlik's tail is conventional and angular, its tall, trapezoidal profile fin carrying a similarly shaped, balanced and tabbed rudder. Its rectangular plan tailplane is mounted on the top of the extreme rear fuselage, placing its straight-edged, tapered, one-piece, tabbed elevator behind the rudder. The rudder is entirely fabric-covered and the elevator largely so.

The landing gear is conventional and fixed, with steel tube, V-strut main legs hinged from the lower fuselage longerons. Each leg is cross-linked to the top of the other with a steel rod and has an elastic shock absorber within the fuselage. Originally the rather small wheels were exposed. The castoring tailwheel was on a long, trailing spring.

The Orlik proved to be easy and pleasant to fly. Criticisms were confined to its landing limitations; the absence of flaps meant a shallow approach, the absence of brakes could be a problem at short strips and its small wheels did not suit rough surfaces.

After a period of disuse the Orlik was quickly restored to flight in mid-2003. Photographs from that year show the wheels enclosed in spats and flaps which occupy all the trailing edge inboard of the aileron. It underwent a series of quantitative tests with results good enough to encourage Orliński's son to start a second airframe in 2004. It is not known if this was completed.

Operational history

Five months after its first flight in 1987 the Orlik appeared in public for the first time at the 6th Amateur Constructors' Rally. It made a good impression and took one of the two first prizes. After restoration and tests in 2003, it flew in public at an Air Force open day in September 2010.

Specifications

References

Homebuilt aircraft
1980s Polish sport aircraft
Low-wing aircraft
Single-engined tractor aircraft
Aircraft first flown in 1987